Thomas Joseph McCarthy (born June 7, 1966) is an American film director, screenwriter, and actor who has appeared in several films, including Meet the Parents and Good Night, and Good Luck, and television series such as The Wire, Boston Public, Law & Order etc.

McCarthy has received critical acclaim for his writing/direction work for the independent films The Station Agent (2003), The Visitor (2007), Win Win (2011), and Spotlight (2015), the last of which won the Academy Award for Best Picture, won McCarthy the Academy Award for Best Original Screenplay, and earned him a nomination for the Academy Award for Best Director.

Additionally, McCarthy co-wrote the film Up (2009) with Bob Peterson and Pete Docter, for which they received an Academy Award nomination for Best Original Screenplay. McCarthy also wrote the film Million Dollar Arm (2014) and served as a director and executive producer for the Netflix television series 13 Reasons Why (2017).

Early life
Thomas Joseph McCarthy was raised in New Providence, New Jersey, one of five children of Carol and Eugene F. "Gene" McCarthy; His father worked in the textile industry. McCarthy was raised Catholic, in a family of Irish descent. McCarthy is a graduate of New Providence High School in New Providence, New Jersey and Boston College, Class of 1988, where he was a member of the improv comedy troupe My Mother's Fleabag; and the Yale School of Drama, where he studied under Earle R. Gister.

Career
McCarthy spent several years doing stand-up comedy and theater in Minneapolis and Chicago before going into television and film. He starred in Flags of Our Fathers as James Bradley, and in the final season of The Wire as the morally challenged reporter Scott Templeton. He made his Broadway debut in the 2001 revival of Noises Off!.

McCarthy's directorial debut, The Station Agent, which he also wrote, won the Audience Award and the Waldo Salt Screenwriting Award at the 2003 Sundance Film Festival. The film also won the BAFTA Award for Best Original Screenplay and the Independent Spirit Award for Best First Screenplay and the Independent Spirit John Cassavetes Award. The Station Agent also won awards at film festivals ranging from San Sebastian to Stockholm, Mexico City, and Aspen.

McCarthy's second feature film was The Visitor, which premiered at the 2007 Toronto International Film Festival. For The Visitor, McCarthy won the 2008 Independent Spirit Award for Best Director. McCarthy appeared in the 2009 dramas The Lovely Bones and 2012. In 2010, McCarthy was nominated for an Academy Award for Best Original Screenplay for the animated film Up.

In 2010, McCarthy directed the unaired pilot for the HBO series Game of Thrones, but the final cut of the episode was poorly received by showrunners David Benioff and D. B. Weiss. McCarthy was replaced by Tim Van Patten, who directed the final version of the pilot that aired in 2011. The experience discouraged McCarthy from returning to television directing for several years.

He also co-wrote and directed 2011's Win Win based on his experiences as a wrestler at New Providence High School.

McCarthy's 2015 film, the independent drama film Spotlight, received widespread acclaim following its release. The film received six Academy Awards nominations, three Golden Globe Awards nominations, two Screen Actors Guild Awards nominations, and eight Critics' Choice Movie Awards nominations.

McCarthy directed the first two episodes of 13 Reasons Why, from Anonymous Content and Paramount Television. The show is based on the 2007 The New York Times bestselling YA book by Jay Asher. In 2019, he signed a first look TV deal with Fox 21 Television Studios (now 20th Television).

Filmography

Film

Acting credits

Television

Acting credits

Other awards and nominations

References

External links

 
 
 
 

1966 births
Living people
American male film actors
American male screenwriters
American male television actors
American people of Irish descent
Best Original Screenplay BAFTA Award winners
Boston College alumni
Independent Spirit Award for Best Director winners
People from New Providence, New Jersey
Yale School of Drama alumni
20th-century American male actors
21st-century American male actors
Film directors from New Jersey
Independent Spirit Award winners
Best Original Screenplay Academy Award winners
Best Screenplay AACTA International Award winners
Catholics from New Jersey
Screenwriters from New Jersey
Yale University alumni